Chahreddine "Chano" Boukholda (born 24 May 1996) is a French professional footballer who plays as a midfielder for Arda Kardzhali.

Professional career
Boukholda is a youth product of Monaco, who moved to Lille in 2017. On 29 July 2019, Boukholda transferred to Belenenses SAD. Boukholda made his professional debut with Belenenses SAD in a 3-2 Primeira Liga loss to S.L. Benfica on 31 January 2020.

Personal life
Born in France, Boukholda is of Algerian descent.

References

External links
 
 

1996 births
Footballers from Marseille
Living people
French footballers
French sportspeople of Algerian descent
Association football midfielders
Belenenses SAD players
C.D. Mafra players
ES Sétif players
FC Arda Kardzhali players
Primeira Liga players
Championnat National 2 players
Liga Portugal 2 players
First Professional Football League (Bulgaria) players
French expatriate footballers
Expatriate footballers in Portugal
French expatriate sportspeople in Portugal
Expatriate footballers in Bulgaria